Khalid Ghani Chaudhry is a Pakistani politician who was a Member of the Provincial Assembly of the Punjab, from May 2013 to May 2018.

Early life and education
He was born on 9 December 1958 in Shorkot.

He has a degree of Bachelor of Arts and a degree of Bachelor of Laws which he obtained in 1984 from Punjab University Law College.

Political career

He was elected to the Provincial Assembly of the Punjab as a candidate of Pakistan Muslim League (Nawaz) from Constituency PP-80 (Jhang-VIII) in 2013 Pakistani general election.

References

Living people
Punjab MPAs 2013–2018
1958 births
Pakistan Muslim League (N) politicians